The intersex flag is a pride flag representing intersex individuals and the intersex community. It was created by Morgan Carpenter of Intersex Human Rights Australia in 2013.

History and design
The flag was created in July 2013 by Morgan Carpenter of Intersex Human Rights Australia (then known as Organisation Intersex International Australia) to create a flag "that is not derivative, but is yet firmly grounded in meaning". Yellow and purple were chosen as colours as they were viewed as free from gender associations and were historically used to represent intersex people. The circle is described as "unbroken and unornamented, symbolizing wholeness and completeness, and our potentialities."

The organization describes it as freely available "for use by any intersex person or organization who wishes to use it, in a human rights affirming community context".

In 2021, the intersex flag was incorporated into the Progress Pride version of the rainbow pride flag by Valentino Vecchietti of Intersex Equality Rights UK.

Usage
The flag has been utilised by a range of media and human rights organisations. In June 2018, intersex activists took part in Utrecht Canal Pride, waving the flag. 

In May 2018, New Zealand became the first country where the intersex flag was raised outside the national parliament.

Gallery

See also
 Intersex
 Intersex human rights

References

Flag
Human gender and sexuality symbols
Flags introduced in 2013
LGBT flags